Jeffrey de Graaf (born 21 November 1990) is a Dutch-Swedish darts player. He has played in six World Championships (four BDO and two PDC) but has lost in the first round each time. He moved from the BDO to the PDC in 2016.

Career

BDO
In 2012, De Graaf began playing the international circuit and won the 2012 Isle of Man Open and 2012 Romanian Open. He reached also the quarter-finals of the Zuiderduin Masters.

De Graaf managed to qualify for the 2013 BDO World Championship, where he faced compatriot Jan Dekker in the first round. He missed one match dart in the final set, and Dekker ultimately won by three sets to two. De Graaf won in the course of the year the Denmark Open and Swedish Open.
De Graaf qualified for the 2014 World Championship, where he lost 3–0 to Martin Atkins in the first round. De Graaf also played in the 2014 BDO World Trophy. After winning in the first two rounds, he lost in the quarter-finals to James Wilson. Later in the year De Graaf again won two titles, the Denmark Masters and the Finnish Open.

In his third Lakeside appearance, De Graaf was eliminated in the first round again, this time 3–0 by Brian Dawson. He reached the final of the BDO World Trophy in February, in which he played against Geert De Vos. De Graaf missed one match dart for the title and ultimately lost 10–9. In the rest of the year De Graaf won three titles, the German Open, the Denmark Masters and the Belgium Open.

At his fourth attempt at the Lakeside De Graaf was knocked out again in the first round, losing 3–2 against compatriot Richard Veenstra. 
A few days later, De Graaf announced his move from the BDO to the PDC.

PDC
De Graaf firstly played the Q-School to get a tour card for the PDC Pro Tour, which he took on the third day. Then De Graaf qualified for the UK Open, where he started in the second round. He defeated William O'Connor 6–5 on the main stage. A round later, he lost 9–8 against Rob Cross after leading 8–5. In late March, De Graaf also made his debut on the European Tour at the German Darts Masters. After beating Darren Johnson 6–4 in the first round, he was defeated by Michael Smith 6–5 in the second round. A consistent debut year in the PDC saw him qualify for the Players Championship Finals and he overcame Steve Beaton 6–4, before being eliminated 6–1 by Robbie Green in the second round, despite averaging 101.22.

De Graaf won a place in the 2017 World Championship through the European Order of Merit and he lost 3–1 to Jelle Klaasen in the first round.

He lost his PDC Tour Card at the end of 2018 following a 3–2 defeat to Noel Malicdem in the first round of the 2019 PDC World Darts Championship. In 2023, he started to represent Sweden instead of Netherlands, and made his debut at PDC Nordic and Baltic Tour.

World Championship results

BDO
 2013: First round (lost to Jan Dekker 2–3)
 2014: First round (lost to Martin Atkins 0–3)
 2015: First round (lost to Brian Dawson 0–3)
 2016: First round (lost to Richard Veenstra 2–3)

PDC
 2017: First round (lost to Jelle Klaasen 1–3)
 2019: First round (lost to Noel Malicdem 2–3)

Performance timeline

BDO

PDC

Career finals

BDO major finals: 1 (1 runner-up)

References

External links

1990 births
Living people
Dutch darts players
Swedish darts players
British Darts Organisation players
Professional Darts Corporation former tour card holders
People from Schagen
Sportspeople from North Holland